The 1986–87 Carlsberg National Basketball League season was the fifteenth and last season of the National Basketball League formed in 1972.

The league was sponsored by Carlsberg for the third consecutive year. Portsmouth won the first division league title, Kingston Kings claimed the Play Off's & Crystal Palace lifted the National Cup for the seventh time in their history. Team Walsall (formerly Team Sandwell) won the second division. This would be the last National League season because the top English and Scottish teams would breakaway and form the British Basketball League.

Team changes
The first division was reduced to thirteen teams following two mergers. Manchester United and Manchester Giants merged at the end of April 1986 and agreed to take the name Manchester United and play in Stretford. The second merger came four months later at the beginning of September 1986 when Crystal Palace and Brunel Uxbridge & Camden Ducks joined forces with fixtures being split between the Crystal Palace Sports Centre and Brunel University. In between the two mergers the Nissan Worthing Bears and Tyneside Basketball Club both folded. The EBBA admitted two new teams in the form of Calderdale Explorers and Derby Rams from the second division.

Carlsberg League standings

First Division

Hemel v Bolton fixture not played and Bolton were deducted one point

Second Division

Carlsberg playoffs

Quarter-finals

Semi-finals

Third Place

Final

Prudential National Cup

Second round

Quarter-finals

Semi-finals

Final

British Masters Cup

References

See also
Basketball in England
British Basketball League
English Basketball League
List of English National Basketball League seasons

 
British
National Basketball League (England) seasons